John Whitney  (1874–?) was an English footballer. His regular position was at full back. He was born in Lancashire. He played for Manchester United.

External links
MUFCInfo.com profile

1874 births
English footballers
Manchester United F.C. players
Year of death missing
Association football defenders